Claudia Faniello (born 25 February 1988) is a Maltese singer. She represented Malta in the Eurovision Song Contest 2017 with the song "Breathlessly"
She came 3rd with the song Gmielek in the maltese festival MuzikaMuzika 2022

Biography

Early career
Claudia was born and raised in Qawra, Malta, along with her siblings Fabrizio and Miriana. Her father is Italian. At the age of twelve, Claudia began to participate in a variety of television shows and participating also in many festivals and placing in top positions. In 2001, at the Phoenicia Hotel in Malta, she won the 'Talentissimi Juniors' – a show organised by 'Actreact'. A year later she sang live with Malta's National Orchestra in aid of impoverished children at the University of Malta. She was accompanied by Malta's ambassadors in the Eurovision Song Contest 2004, Julie & Ludwig and also her brother Fabrizio.

At the Mediterranean Conference Festival, in 2003 she sang at a concert with Fabrizio Faniello while a year later she sang again with the National Orchestra with Nadine Axisa, Fabrizio and Philippa. In 2005, she classified fourth on Hotspot – a TV show programmed on Net TV. The year 2006 was the year when she started her experience in the Malta Song For Europe Festival with the song "High Alert!" – a song composed by Ray Agius. At the same contest she won the award for best newcomer.

She won the Festival Kanzunetta Indipendenza 2006 with the song "Ma Nafx" – a song composed by Ray Agius. In 2007, despite qualifying for the Malta Song for Europe 2007 Semi-Final with the song "L-Imħabba Għamja" (Love is Blind), she wasn't part of the six songs that gained the right to compete for the final round. She finished 7th.

2006–2016: Maltese national selection competitions for Eurovision

In summer 2007, Claudia Faniello launched "Wild Flower", a song composed by Aldo Spiteri and written by Deo Grech. In 2008, she passed for the Go Malta Song for Europe Semi-Final Festival with two songs "Caravaggio" and "Sunrise". Both songs passed into the final eight songs. In the final of this festival she finished 2nd with the song "Caravaggio", a song about the Italian artist with the same name and 3rd with the song "Sunrise". The successive year, she made her fourth appearance in this Maltese festival, but still wasn't part of the last three songs that fought to book a place in Moscow 2009. She finished fourth with her song entitled "Blue Sonata", composed and written by Ray Agius. She qualified to the final in the Go Malta Eurosong 2010 with the song "Samsara" composed by Philip Vella and written Gerard James Borg. She finished eighth with 31 points. She released her first album entitled Convincingly Better in August 2010. In the Go Malta Eurosong 2011 final Faniello ended in ninth place with her entry "Movie in my Mind". In the Go Malta Eurosong 2012 final Faniello reached second place with her entry "Pure".

2017: National final and Eurovision
Faniello represented Malta in the Eurovision Song Contest 2017 after winning the national final with the song "Breathlessly".

After Eurovision
In August 2019 she released a new single named "Fallin". 

In June 2020 she released a new single called 'Say'.

In October 2021 she released a new single called 'When is it'.

Discography

Albums

Singles

References

External links

Official website

1988 births
Living people
21st-century Maltese women singers
21st-century Maltese singers
Maltese people of Italian descent
Eurovision Song Contest entrants of 2017
Eurovision Song Contest entrants for Malta